Kjell Karlsson may refer to:
Kjell Karlsson (Malmö FF footballer), Swedish footballer who played for Malmö FF 1939–1940 	
Kjell Karlsson (footballer born 1953) (born 1953), Swedish footballer